"If I Could Build My Whole World Around You" is a popular song recorded by Marvin Gaye and Tammi Terrell in 1967 and released in November 14, 1967. Written by Harvey Fuqua, Johnny Bristol, and Vernon Bullock, the single was Gaye & Terrell's third single together and the second to go Top Ten on both the Pop and R&B charts of Billboard, peaking at number ten and number two, respectively.

Background
The duo's vocals go back and forth as they described what could be if either was able to "build a world" around their loved one. It was one of few songs that set the duo apart from other R&B duos of the time. In time, this song among other legendary duets by the two soul icons would become the landmark for R&B duets to this day. The song was also one of the few songs that was written by someone other than Ashford & Simpson, who had written several hit songs for the duo.

Billboard described the single as a "groovy blues item headed right for a choice spot on the top 100" with a "powerful vocal performance by the duet."  Cash Box said that "vocal performances with enough power to make the side are highlighted by some wonderful lively arrangements."

Personnel
All vocals by Marvin Gaye and Tammi Terrell
Instrumentation by The Funk Brothers

Chart performance

References

1967 singles
Marvin Gaye songs
Tammi Terrell songs
Male–female vocal duets
Songs written by Johnny Bristol
Songs written by Harvey Fuqua
Song recordings produced by Harvey Fuqua
1967 songs
Tamla Records singles
Song recordings produced by Johnny Bristol